Trioceros conirostratus, the South Sudanese unicorn chameleon, is a species of chameleon found in South Sudan and Uganda.

References

Trioceros
Reptiles described in 1998
Taxa named by Colin R. Tilbury
Reptiles of South Sudan
Reptiles of Uganda